Francis Child may refer to:

Sir Francis Child (died 1713) (1642–1713), English banker and politician
Sir Francis Child (died 1740) (1684–1740), English banker and politician
Francis Child (died 1763) (1735–1763), English politician
 Francis James Child (1825–1896), American educator and folklorist

See also